Simone Kaho (born 1978) is a New Zealand poet of Tongan descent.

She was born in Auckland and received an MA in creative writing from the International Institute of Modern Letters at Victoria University of Wellington.

Her poetry has appeared in various journals including JAAM (Just Another Art Movement), Turbine and The Dominion Post. A performance poet, she has appeared in shows such as The Kerouac Effect and Poetry Live. In 2016, she published a collection of poetry Lucky Punch. The New Zealand Book Council included Lucky Punch on their list of "21 new Kiwi books we can’t wait to read".

Kaho was included in the 20/20 Collection published by the New Zealand Book Awards Trust, her work having been selected by poet Paula Green.

References 

1978 births
Living people
New Zealand poets
New Zealand people of Tongan descent
People from Auckland
International Institute of Modern Letters alumni